The Weaker Sex may refer to:

 The Weaker Sex (play), a 1929 play by the French writer Édouard Bourdet
 The Weaker Sex (1917 film), a 1917 American film directed by Raymond B. West
 The Weaker Sex (1933 film), a French film adaptation of the 1929 play
 The Weaker Sex, a 1948 British film directed by Roy Ward Baker
 The Weaker(?) Sex, a Canadian television talk show
 "The Weaker Sex" (Sliders), an episode of the TV show Sliders